Matagorda Peninsula Army Airfield is a closed military airfield, located on Matagorda Island, Texas.   It was used during  World War II as a training airfield by the 77th Flying Training Wing, Army Air Forces Central Flying Training Command.

History

World War II
The airfield was built during 1942 by the Army Air Corps, primarily to support the Matagorda Bombing Range. In addition it was also developed as a training school by Army Air Forces Training Command.   Matagorda AAF was the home of the AAF Pilot School (Advanced Single Engine), and also conducted a Single-Engine Pilot Transition school.   The major military units assigned were the  62d Single Engine Flying Training Group and 79th Bombardier Training Group.

Initially built with three runways,  during the war two additional runways were added to accommodate the large number of landings and takeoffs.  Aircraft assigned to the base were North American AT-6 Texans, Curtiss P-40 Warhawks, Republic P-47 Thunderbolts, and North American P-51 Mustangs.    A series of curved roads on the east side of the parking ramp had dozens of buildings.  After the war ended, the training school was inactivated and the facility was closed in November 1945.

Civil use

After the war ended, the airfield was transferred to civil control, and was known as Matagorda Peninsula Airport.

In the late 1940s, the National Advisory Committee for Aeronautics considered Matagorda Island as a rocket launch site, however Cape Canaveral, Florida was chosen instead.

In the 1980s, a private firm, Space Services, Inc. of America (SSIA), established a rocket launch facility on the island for commercial rockets with the airport, known as Pierce Field, providing aircraft access.

However SSIA only ever conducted two rocket tests at this facility. The first was of their Percheron rocket which exploded on the pad during an engine test firing on 5th August 1981, and then a single successful launch of their Conestoga I on 9th September 1982, which became the first privately funded rocket to reach space.

The airfield remained active until about 2002 when SSIA ended its use of Matagorda Island, and the airport was closed and abandoned.

Today, the airport is closed and its facilities are deteriorating. Some old rocket launch stands can be found in the area. The World War II military base was dismantled and no longer remains.

See also

 Matagorda Island Air Force Base
 Texas World War II Army Airfields
 77th Flying Training Wing (World War II)

References
Notes

Sources

Airfields of the United States Army Air Forces in Texas
Military installations closed in 1945
1942 establishments in Texas
1945 disestablishments in Texas